Cross Brook is a tributary of Six Mile Run in Somerset and Middlesex Counties, New Jersey in the United States.

Course
It flows through the Six Mile Run Reservoir Site and crosses Jacques Lane.

Animal life
Cross Brook is a slow-moving stream, although it is not marshy. Some species of fish may be expected to be found in it.

Terrain
The Cross Brook starts as a lake which drains into grasslands, forming a marshy area around its source. It is still muddy farther downstream. It tends to be a wide, slow, deep stream.

Accessibility
Cross Brook is a short stream, only crossing one road. There are a few trails in the woods that lead to it.

Sister tributaries
Nine Mile Run
Steep Hill Brook
Middlebush Brook

Gallery

See also
List of rivers of New Jersey

References

External links
USGS Coordinates in Google Maps

Rivers of Middlesex County, New Jersey
Tributaries of the Raritan River
Rivers of New Jersey
Rivers of Somerset County, New Jersey